The Jauch family of Germany is a Hanseatic family which can be traced back till the Late Middle Ages. At the end of the 17th century the family showed up in the Free Imperial and Hanseatic City of Hamburg. The members of the family acted as long-distance merchants. They became hereditary grand burghers of Hamburg and were Lords of Wellingsbüttel Manor – nowadays a quarter of Hamburg.

The Jauch have brought forth some notable lineal descendants, both patrilineal and matrilineal. They can trace the nearer cognatic kinship of the issue of the progenitor Johann Christian Jauch the Elder (1638–1718) in the following centuries to a number of renowned contemporaries.

Overview

Pre-Hanseatic time
The Jauch originate from Thuringia where as the first family member the widow Lena Joherrin is chronicled 1495 in today's Bad Sulza.

Johann Christian Jauch the Elder (1638–1718) left Sulza and entered the service of the Güstrow branch of the Grand Ducal House of Mecklenburg. Two of his sons joined the service of the Electors of Saxony and Kings of Poland. These branches were since the lieutenant colonel of the  Franz Georg Jauch (b. 1681) and the major general Joachim Daniel Jauch (1688–1754) mistakenly regarded as members of the aristocracy. They became extinct in the 18th century.

The members of the family who had served the Grand Ducal House of Mecklenburg  left the Residenz Güstrow in 1696 and turned to Lüneburg, which was equal to a Free Imperial City. In 1701 they gained the citizenship of Lüneburg. Even though the family there brought forth clerics and jurists thereunder a canon, a secular canon and a dean as well as a senator of Hannover it was not only confined to the urban educated middle class. Other members of the family acted as merchants – listed 1699 at the „Uraltes löbliches Kramer-Amt“, the Merchants Guild at Hamburg – and subsequently as internationally acting merchants.

Hanseatics

Grand Burghers of Hamburg

The trading firm was relocated in the middle of the 18th century by Carl Daniel Jauch (1714–1794) from the falling back Lüneburg to Hamburg, the ″Queen of the cities″. Since the 17th century Hamburg played a special role in Germany's economic history because thanks to its  it came out of the Thirty Years' War as the wealthiest and most populous of all German cities.

Hamburg was a strictly bourgeois mercantile republic in which neither nobility existed, which was exiled since 1276, nor patricians in the strict sense of the formally defined class of governing elites found within the other free imperial cities. In contrast to the mediatised burgesses in the towns located in monarchies which were governed by authoritarianism Hamburg was characterized by its free citizens tied to the culture of England. Although a republic the town was not a democracy moreover an oligarchy because it was governed solely by the Hanseaten. They formed the small in Hamburg and Bremen purely bourgeois upper class of society in the sovereign and republican states Hamburg, Bremen and Lübeck.

These three cities built up between 1630 and 1650 the Hanseatic Community. It was formed after the Hanseatic League became informally extinct in the beginning of the 17th century. Therefore, it has to be differentiated between the earlier Hanseatic merchants of the former Hanseatic League and the later Hanseaten as a class of the three cities which built the Hanseatic Community.

Since the end of the 18th century the family belongs to the Hanseaten.  (1765–1855) who is the last common ancestor of today's Jauch, gained at the end of the 18th century the citizenship of the Free Imperial and Hanseatic City of Hamburg and subsequently the hereditary grand burghership. Rittmeister  (1848–1930) was for almost twenty years till 1915 – when he volunteered regardless of his age for military service in the Landwehr cavalry - one of the last members of the Hamburg Parliament, who were delegated as representatives of the grand burghers and not contesting an election by the burghers.

In the German Revolution of 1918–19 the workers' and soldiers' councils put the city administrations under their control ending the reign of the Hanseaten also in Hamburg.

Land Owners in Hamburg, Lords of Manors in the Kingdom of Denmark
The family owned on the Elbe next to the old Hamburg timber harbour and situated on the city's dyke the Baroque house Stadtdeich number 10 and the nearby houses Stadtdeich 3 and Stadtdeich an der Elbseite (on the Elbside) 159.

Destroyed along with this historical building were the family crypt on the former cemetery in Hamm, Hamburg and the Auguste Jauch Woman's Home for Needy Widows located Bürgerweide 59 there.

Around the Outer Alster Lake the Jauch possessed the houses An der Alster 24, An der Alster 28 and Schwanenwik 18. In addition, they possessed country houses on the Bille in Reinbek and in the then popular garden suburb Hamm.

The regions surrounding Hamburg belonged to the Duchy of Holstein and were since 1713 territory of the Kingdom of Denmark, later Province of Schleswig-Holstein in the Kingdom of Prussia. Here became the property of the Jauch Wellingsbüttel Manor,  and Krummbek Manor and the estates Fernsicht and Marienhof on the Stör at Kellinghusen and Schwonendal in Karby, Schleswig-Holstein.

Today the Jauch own the Von Othegraven Winery. The manor house, its English garden and the vineyard Kanzemer Altenberg constitute a listed cultural heritage site.
 The manor house was heavily damaged at the end of the Second World War by the U.S. 10th Armored Division shooting from the other side of the Saar river. It was restored and enlarged between 1954 and 1956. According to Stuart Pigott von Othegraven Winery ″is one of the most beautiful properties″ in the region.

The plantation Armenia Lorena and other coffee plantations of the Jauch nearby San Rafael Pie de la Cuesta in Guatemala were under severe pressure of the US government seized by the Guatemalan government in the Second World War  and expropriated without compensation in 1953.

Notables in the Hamburg Self-Government
While the commoners in the landlocked Imperial States of the Holy Roman Empire were subjected to bureaucracy and its civil officialdom, Hamburg was distinguished by its honorary self-government by the most respected of its free citizens, the Hamburg notables.

Keeping with the age-old Hanseatic tradition in setting up humanitarian foundations the Jauch maintained a daily soup kitchen for the poor for free. They also built and maintained almshouses in Hamburg and Wellingsbüttel.

Johann Christian Jauch senior (1765–1855) served from 1820 until 1833 as dyke-count and first dyke count of Hamburg-Hammerbrook. He was in charge as first dyke count when the dam failed during the February flood of 1825, 2.000 feet southeast of the Jauch house Stadtdeich 10 in Hamburg.

Cavalry Officers in the Hamburg Citizen Militia
In the Hamburg Citizen Militia the social class and the wealth of the individual predetermined the branch of his service and his military rank – which was the opposite of the Royal Prussian Army where the officer rank made the individual a member of the upper class of society. The most prestigious citizens gladly served as officers in the militia.

The service in the cavalry was generally a badge of high-ranking social status not least because of the high costs caused by maintaining the cavalry horses and the keeping of a groom which had to be borne by each cavalryman himself. All metal parts of a cavalry officer uniform had to be gilded. For these reasons the Hanseatic cavalry was the stomping ground for the grand burghers.

The conscripted members of the family performed their service in the militia as first lieutenants in the cavalry under the cavalry commanders Rittmeister Ernst Merck and later Rittmeister Adolph Godeffroy.

Ancestors from the Time of the Hanseatic League
Among the ancestors of the Hamburg branch of the family are several First Mayors of the city-state of Hamburg, historically equivalent to a sovereign head of state.

Progeny
Eleonora Maria Jauch (1732–1797) is the ancestress of the Lübeck Hanseatic  to which belong her son the burgomaster (head of state) Christian Adolph Overbeck and her grandson the painter and head of the Nazarene movement Friedrich Overbeck.

Constance Jauch (1722–1802) is the ancestress of the Polish noble   which was granted the indygenat by the sejm. Her son Karol Mauricy Lelewel, godson of King Augustus III of Poland, belongs to the fathers of the Constitution of May 3, 1791 which is regarded to be the first modern constitution of Europe, grown out of the spirit of Polish Enlightenment.  The Polish historian and rebel Joachim Lelewel (1786–1861), grandson of Constance Jauch, was creator of Poland's unofficial motto "For our freedom and yours". He was member of Poland's Provisional Government in the November Uprising 1830. Czar Nicholas I was dethroned in 1831 as King of Poland under his leadership as president of the radical . His brother Lieutenant Colonel Jan Pawel Lelewel (1796–1847) participated on 3 April 1833 in the Frankfurter Wachensturm, the attempt to start a revolution in all German states.

Colonel  (1798–1859), son of Ludovica Jauch (1772–1805), was one of the thirtytwo members of the Emperor Deputation on 3 April 1849 which offered Frederick William IV of Prussia the office of emperor. Lieutenant general of the Waffen-SS Karl Fischer von Treuenfeld, descendant of Eleonora Maria Jauch (1732–1797), was a close friend of Erich Ludendorff and one of the leading figures of the Beer Hall Putsch in 1923, a failed attempt by Adolf Hitler, to seize power in Germany. Charlotte Jauch's (1811–1872) grandson Otto von Feldmann (1873–1945) was policy officer of Paul von Hindenburg and in charge of the campaign by which Hindenburg became President of Germany in 1925.

History

Origins in Sulza
Matthias Jauch Jauch there was enfeoffed by the sovereign with the Segelitz estate. Georg Jauch (1606–1675) was burgomaster of Sulza.

In Attendance on the Grand Ducal House of Mecklenburg

In the 17th century Sulza has been twice devastated, 1613 by the 
 and 1640 when it was plundered by Swedish troops. Johann Christian Jauch the Elder (1638–1718) left the fallen back Sulza and relocated to Güstrow where he entered 1662 the service of the Grand Ducal House of Mecklenburg at its residence Güstrow Castle. He was a member of the ducal household of Magdalena Sibylle, née Duchess of Schleswig-Holstein-Gottorf, wife of Gustav Adolph, Duke of Mecklenburg-Güstrow, until he became 1669 First Valet de chambre of Crown Prince Carl of Mecklenburg-Güstrow. 1665 he married Ingborg Nicolai (†1696), who had come to Güstrow with the duchess Magdalena Sibylle from Gottorf Castle, serving her as lady's maid and confidant. The social rank of a servant at these times mirrored the lordship − the higher the lordship, the better the opportunities for the servant to reach a prestigious position himself.  A ducal valet de chambre ranked in Mecklenburg-Güstrow equal to The Very Reverend, thus allowing the lordship to demonstrate its own rank. Suitably the first daughters of Johann Christian and Ingborg Jauch married members of the nobility.

In 1688, Crown Prince Carl died without a male heir. Johann Christian Jauch the Elder quit the service and became burgher of the city of Güstrow, dealing at retail and being a court shoemaker, purveyor to the ducal family. His eldest son Johann Christopher Jauch (1669–1725) had been a stipendiary of the duke and carried out since the end of 1694 the function of a court chaplain. After the death of the last Duke of Mecklenburg-Güstrow, Gustav Adolph, in 1695 the dukedom of Mecklenburg-Güstrow became extinct. Though duchess Magdalena Sibylla maintained a small court until 1718 the residence Güstrow lost its splendour and relevance. Moreover, Ingborg Jauch had already died. Therefore, almost all family members left Güstrow 1696 and turned to Lüneburg.

In Attendance on the House of Hanover
1701 the Jauchs became burghers of Lüneburg. At Lüneburg Johann Christopher Jauch (1669–1725) was Royal British and Electoral Brunswick-Lüneburg Dean of the Lutheran churches at St. John's Church, Lüneburg, while Johann Christian Jauch (1702–1778) became canon, 1754 subsenior collegii canonici, 1760 The Very Reverend and vice-dean with the function of a provost of the Lutheran cathedral of Bardowick. He married Clara Maria Rhüden (1710–1775), who was a great-great-grandchild of the Lutheran theologian of the Protestant Reformation  (1559–1605), thereby ancestor of all later Jauchs, son of deacon Paul Gesner, who was taught by Martin Luther and consecrated by Johannes Bugenhagen. Her great-great-grandfather, the professor of philosophy at Hamburg, Bernhard Werenberg (1577–1643), has been an opponent to the noted scientist Joachim Jungius at the same place. Her uncle was the predecessor of Johann Christopher Jauch and great-grandson of Philipp Melanchthon Heinrich Jonathan Werenberg (1651–1713). Ludolph Friedrich Jauch (1698–1764), son of the dean Johann Christopher Jauch, was Senior Pastor of Lüneburg's St. Michael's Church, his brother Tobias Christoph Jauch (1703–1776), was a legal practitioner and deputy, member of the municipal council of Lüneburg. Carl Jauch (1735–1818) was Royal British and Electoral Brunswick-Lüneburg judge of the castle court of justice in Horneburg and canon of the Cathedral of Bardowick, Friedrich August Jauch (1741–1796), son of the imperial civil law notary Adolph Jauch (1705–1758), was senator and police governor of the city of Hannover.

Carl Jauch (1680–1755), merchant in Lüneburg, has been a supporter of the theologian, alchemist and physician Johann Konrad Dippel, by some authors debatably claimed to be the model for Mary Shelley's novel Frankenstein. After Dippel's expulsion from Denmark 1727 Carl Jauch gave shelter to the refugee who was 1729 expelled from Lüneburg, too. Carl Jauch was married to a grandniece of the Lübeck dean  (1640–1698), who strongly influenced the faith and the thinking of Johann Sebastian Bach.

Eleonora Maria Jauch's (1732–1797) father-in-law was the dean of Bardowick , in whose foster-parental home August Hermann Francke 1687 had been guest when he experienced his so-called "Lüneburg conversion", making him one of the earliest leaders of Pietism.

In Attendance on the Electors of Saxony and Kings of Poland
1698 Johann Christopher Jauch adjourned his function in Lüneburg and served as court chaplain for Christiane Eberhardine of Brandenburg-Bayreuth, queen consort of Poland and grand duchess consort of Lithuania during her cure at Pretzsch, encouraging her to keep at her Lutheran faith after the conversion of her husband to Catholicism. Christiane Eberhardine later was named by her Protestant countrymen "The Praying Pillar of Saxony"

His brother Joachim Daniel (1688–1754) served at first in the army of the Republic of the Seven United Netherlands, before he changed 1705 as lieutenant into the Saxon army. He took part as a captain in the first siege of Stralsund 1711–12 during the Great Northern War. At the end he was contemporaneously royal Polish colonel (since 1736), electoral Saxon major general (since 1746), superintendent of the Saxon building authority in Poland (since 1721), with the title director (since 1736), remunerated for each function separately. His primary obligation was to supervise the baroque development of the city of Warsaw. Vital was his responsibility for the extensive merrymakings of the Saxon court at Warsaw.

When 1730 at the end of tremendous fireworks at Zeithain which lasted for five hours, instead of the correct "VIVAT" in front of 48 foreign princes and numerous other lords a mistake in writing occurred and a "FIFAT" was illuminated, he gained his cognomen "Fifat". He erected the Palais Jauch in Warsaw's suburb Solec and was architect for a number of prominent baroque buildings in Poland.

He married Eva Maria Münnich, said to be the daughter of the later Russian field marshal Burkhard Christoph Count von Münnich (1683–1767), his predecessor as superintendent of the Saxon building authority. His son August von Jauch (b. 1731) was godson of King Augustus II the Strong. The elaborate cradle endowed to his parents by the king, later the cradle for Joachim Lelewel, is exhibited in the National Museum, Kraków. Joachim Daniel Jauch is buried in the Capuchins Church in the Miodowa in Warsaw.

Some members of the family followed Major General Joachim Daniel von Jauch (1688–1754) as officers into the Saxon and Polish army, two of them, Franz Georg Jauch (b. 1681) and Heinrich Georg Jauch (b. 1709), serving as lieutenant colonels – colonels in relation to the other regiments – in the Royal Guard of King Augustus II the Strong and King Augustus III of Poland.

Grand Burghers of the Free and Hanseatic City of Hamburg
1699 Franz Jürgen Jauch and his brother Christian Jauch the Younger († 1720) served an apprenticeship as merchant in Hamburg. 1752 the merchant Joachim Daniel Jauch (1714–1795) moved his business from Lüneburg to Hamburg. Lt. Johann Georg Jauch (1727–1799) kidnapped 1754 Anna , daughter of the Secretary of State of Hamburg Magnifizenz Johann Baptista Mutzenbecher (1691–1759), member of one of Hamburg's leading families and married her. Under Johann Christian Jauch senior (1765–1855), son of Johann Georg Jauch, the Jauchs became the most important and wealthiest wood traders of Hamburg who reached grand burghership status of the town. Thus, they became members of the ruling class, the Hanseatics (Hanseaten) in one of the wealthiest cities of Germany, with whose financial capacity only Vienna could compete because of the local high nobility concentrating there and its wealth.

Christian Jauch senior's sons were founders of the three still existing branches of the family: Wellingsbüttel, Schönhagen und Fernsicht.

His eldest son Johann Christian Jauch junior (1802–1880) acquired the Manor house Wellingsbüttel, previously domicile of the penultimate Duke of Schleswig-Holstein-Sonderburg-Beck, Friedrich Karl Ludwig, ancestor of the modern-day British royal family. Alongside his home in Hamburg he erected a deer park and a cage for the bears he brought with himself from his voyages to Russia. The poet Hebbel wrote to his long-time companion Elise Lensing, who had lived for many years in the house Stadtdeich 43, after she moved out:

1863 he was a patron of the international agricultural exhibition on the Heiligengeistfeld.

His son Carl Jauch (1828–1888) was Lord of Wellingsbüttel, too. He married Louise von Plessen (1827–1875), daughter of the Grand Ducal Mecklenburg Governor (Großherzoglich Mecklenburgischen Oberlanddrost) Ulrich von Plessen und great-granddaughter of Baron (Reichsfreiherr) Seneca von Gelting (1715–1786), who was married to a niece of Johannes Thedens and had become highly wealthy as chargé d'affaires of the Dutch East India Company in Cirebon. His grandfather Diederich Brodersen (1640–1717), ancestor of today's Jauchs of the Wellingsbüttel branch is also an ancestor to the composer Johannes Brahms. Because of this marriage the earliest notable ancestor is Helmoldus I de Huckelem, documented 1097 and connecting the Wellingsbüttel branch to numerous prominent other descendants of inter alia the von Plessen, von Moltke und von Oertzen families.

Auguste Jauch (1822–1902) was one of the well known benefactors to the poor of Hamburg. Colonel Hans Jauch (1883–1965), Commander of the Freikorps "Jauch", took part in putting down communist uprisings in 1920 and is founder of the Roman Catholic branch of the family.

Luise Jauch (1885–1933) was head nurse at The Magic Mountain at Davos, the second famous novel of Thomas Mann, when his wife Katia Mann stood there 1912. Luise Jauch's traits have been utilized for the novel's head nurse Adritacia von Mylendonk.

In different polls Günther Jauch (b. 1956) was elected as “Most intelligent German” (2002), “Most wanted TV-star to become politician” (2003) and “Most popular German” (2005). He was awarded in 2001 the World Award for entertainment. Since 2008 his sculpture is part of Madame Tussauds wax museum at Berlin.

Major Landowners in Guatemala
In Guatemala the coffee business was from the beginning in the hand of German investors. ″The US government forced the Guatemalan government to confiscate the German coffee holdings and to arrest German citizens. This allowed US companies to take control of the Guatemalan coffee industry.″

In the Times of the Third Reich

Heinrich Jauch, First State Attorney at Hamburg

Heinrich Jauch (1894–1945) was the Prosecuting Attorney of the Special Tribunal Hamburg in the criminal trial against the Soviet agent during the interwar period Jan Valtin and 52 other defendants of whom nine were condemned to death. Jauch crushed with this trial the Red Navy Hamburg. Valtin reports in his biography “Out of the Night”, the US-bestseller of 1941 and the TIME “Book of the Year”, the trial and the executions:

The trial is regarded to be the model for the Moscow Trials which were a series of three show trials held in the Soviet Union at the instigation of Joseph Stalin between 1936 and 1938. I these trials Stalin got rid of most of the surviving Old Bolsheviks, as well as the former leadership of the Soviet secret police. In addition, it is believed that Heinrich Jauch has won the majority of the death sentences in Hamburg bevor he was called to Berlin.

The first who were sentenced to death were executed on 19 May 1934. Formerly a guillotine had been used, but it had been discarded as a French method of decapitation. Since then people were put to death with an executioner's ax. 

The executions under the direction of Heinrich Jauch became, entwined with the events of the Altona Bloody Sunday, the literary model for a novel and two films. The novelist Arnold Zweig red 1938 in a newspaper in Haifa the mistaken information that Dettmer and others had been executed by a master butcher named Fock who after a couple of months had committed suicide. Zweig made literary use of the beheadings and the alleged fate of the headsman and published 1943 the novel  (The axe of Wandsbek). 1951 an East German film script, The Axe of Wandsbek was adapted from the novel followed by the West German film . In memory of Jonny Dettmer a Stolperstein was set into the ground in front of the house where he lived in Hamburg-Eilbek.

In 1937 Heinrich Jauch brought the charge against Arnold Bernstein a shipowner and pioneer of transatlantic car transport. Bernstein was  imprisoned on charges of foreign exchange offenses. At the time of his arrest, he was the owner of one of the largest Jewish businesses in Germany. The company was confiscated without compensation and after an additional payment of $30,000 in U.S. currency, Bernstein was allowed to leave Germany. The show trial is regarded to be the first major Aryanization of Jewish property.

Similarly, Heinrich Jauch organized that the Nazi state reached control over the trading firm Alfred C. Toepfer Company owned by Alfred Toepfer. He arrested Toepfer on charges of foreign exchange offenses between 1937 and 1938 until Toepfer gave up control over his firm.

Jauch & Hübener and the German Resistance to Nazism
Major General Hans Oster (1887–1945), one of the earliest and most determined opponents of Adolf Hitler and Nazism, moving spirit of German resistance from 1938 to 1943, was a first cousin-in-law of Rittmeister  (1888–1976). Walter Jauch was the founder of Jauch & Hübener, who were at the beginning of the Second World War the largest insurance broker in continental Europe. In the Oster Conspiracy Oster planned  already in 1938 to assassinate German dictator Adolf Hitler, the leader of Nazi Germany. Oster and his opposition group including Hans von Dohnányi were supported by Jauch & Hübener, today's German branch of Aon Corporation. Walter Jauch's co-founder  was arrested 1945 in Hamburg and hanged in late April 1945 without trial, a few days before the end of Nazi Germany.

Robert Jauch, officer commanding in the battle of Stalingrad
Robert Jauch (1913–2000) fought as an officer, almost as an artillery observer, ultimately as first lieutenant and officer commanding (OC) of an artillery battery of the Panzer-Artillerieregiment 16, part of the 16. Panzer-Division, in a number of major battles, including the Battle of France, the Battle of Kiev (1941), the First Battle of Kharkov and the Battle of Kalach. In 1942–1943 he took part  in the Battle of Stalingrad. Of about 400,000 German casualties during the battle about 150,000 fell in the "Cauldron" of Stalingrad itself. The surviving nearly 110,000 Germans of which 2,500 were officers were captured in Stalingrad. Among those was Robert Jauch, who surrendered on his thirtieth birthday, the 2 February 1943. Out of the 110,000 survivors only about 5,000 ever returned from Russia. Robert Jauch became a member of the League of German Officers (BDO), an anti-Nazi organization. He came back to Germany after seven years as a prisoner of war in Yelabuga, Kuibishev and Simferopol as one of the ″late homecomers″ in 1950.

Casualties of World War I and World War II

Eight lineage holders of the Jauch, half of all lineage holders in these generations, died as soldiers on the different European battlefields of the First World War and the Second World War, seven of them killed in action. They all with only one exception had no descendants.

Lt. Rudolf Jauch (1891–1915) died 1915 in the sinking of the submarine U-40 by the submarine HMS C24, cooperating with the decoy-ship Taranki. It was the first U-boot trap victory by the British Royal Navy during the First World War. The Distinguished Service Cross which has been awarded for this action to Commander Captain Frederick Henry Taylor is part of the collection of the National Maritime Museum at Greenwich. It is placed as a controlled site under the Protection of Military Remains Act 1986. – Since their joint training als officer cadets on  Rudolf Jauch was a friend of the later pacifist and anti-war activist Martin Niemöller.

First Lieutenant Günther Jauch (1919–1942), aid de camp of the Panzer-Artillerieregiment 227 was killed in action during the Lyuban Offensive Operation, a major Russian attack as part of the Siege of Leningrad which was one of the longest and most destructive sieges in history and overwhelmingly the most costly in terms of casualties. His final resting place is since 2000 on the German war cemetery Sologubovka.

Daughters of the Jauch and their Descendants

Catharina Elisabeth Jauch (1671–1736) married von Naumann

Catharina Elisabeth Jauch (1671–1736) married the later colonel and architect of King August the Strong, Johann Christoph von Naumann. He was a member of the diplomatic mission of the Holy League in the course of the Treaty of Karlowitz 1699 with the Ottoman Empire, which ended the Great Turkish War.

Juliana Agnesa Jauch (1673 bis nach 1712) married Baroness von Schmiedel
Juliana Agnesa Jauch (1673–1712) married Baron Johann Rudolf von Schmiedel, Saxon district governor and councillor of the board of domains, their son being Baron Franz Rudolf von Schmiedel, Lord Steward of the Household of the extravagant Ernest Augustus I, Duke of Saxe-Weimar-Eisenach.

Constance Jauch (1722–1802) married von Lölhöffel

Joachim Daniel Jauch's daughter Constance Jauch (1722–1802) married Heinrich Lölhöffel von Löwensprung (1705–1763), privy councillor and physician to the King Augustus III of Poland. After the death of her father she erected 1755 by Ephraim Schröger the Lelewel Palace – her polonized name – in the Miodowa. Regardless the early death of her husband in 1763 she enabled a splendid career for her children.

Her son Karol Maurycy Lelewel (1750–1830) married a daughter of the starosta of Babice, niece of the archbishop and metropolitan of the archdiocese of Mogilev  (1745–1831). Karol Mauricy Lelewel was a Royal Polish captain, reached the indygenat, the naturalisation as a Polish noble, and became a member of the general sejm.  1789 he became appointed as cup-bearer of the Grand Duchy of Lithuania, a title possessed prior by Stanisław August Poniatowski before he was elected as the last king and grand duke of the Polish-Lithuanian Commonwealth.

Karol Mauricy was from 1778 until 1794 the lawyer and treasurer of the Commission of National Education, which was because of its vast authority and autonomy considered the first Ministry of Education in European history. Lelwel was also centrally linked to another important achievement of the Polish Enlightenment, the Constitution of May 3, 1791.

After 1789 during the Sejm Wielki the reformers had to sacrifice many of their privileges in order to gain support for the Constitution of May the 3rd. Nevertheless, it is often argued, with quite some force, that because of the efforts of the Commission of National Education, the Polish language and culture did not disappear into oblivion, during the Partitions of Poland - heavy Russification and Germanisation notwithstanding.

Constance Jauch's grandsons were Joachim, Prot und Jan Pawel Lelewel.

Joachim Lelewel (1786–1861) became Poland's most famous historian. He was a rebel, creator of Poland's unofficial motto "For our freedom and yours", member of Poland's Provisional Government 1830, was jointly with Karl Marx and Friedrich Engels founder and vice-president of the Democratic Society for the Unification and Brotherhood of all People in Brussels (Demokratische Gesellschaft zur Einigung und Verbrüderung aller Völker (Brüssel)). The anarchist Michail Bakunin was strongly influenced by him. He was a friend of Gilbert du Motier, marquis de Lafayette, who had given shelter to him in his manor Lagrange, where he was later arrested and then expelled from France. The 29 May is Lelewel's memorial day in the Jewish almanc for his commitment for the Jewish emancipation.

Prot Lelewel (1790–1884) served as a captain during the French invasion of Russia, participated 1812 in the Battle of Berezina and 1813 in the Battle of Leipzig and was decorated as a chevalier of the Légion d'honneur and with the silver medal of the Virtuti Militari. Lieutenant Colonel Jan Pawel Lelewel (1796–1847), was a Polish freedom fighter who unsuccessfully defended 1831 Praga against the Russian invasion and participated on 3 April 1833 in the Frankfurter Wachensturm, the attempt to start a revolution in all German states. 1816–1826 he modernized Zamość Fortress, after his escape from Poland and Germany he became 1837–1947 head engineer of the Canton of Bern.

Constance Jauch's daughter Teresa Lelewelowna (1752–1814) married Adam Józef Cieciszowski (1743–1783), brother of the archbishop and metropolitan . He was Great Scribe of Lithuania and knight of the Order of Saint Stanislaus. Her granddaughter Aleksandra Franciszka Cieciszowska was married to the Polish minister Jan Paweł Łuszczewski 1784–1795 private secretary of the last King and Grand Duke of the Polish-Lithuanian Commonwealth Stanisław August Poniatowski. He was nominated as count by the King Augustus III of Poland. Their granddaughter Jadwiga Łuszczewska (1834–1908), daughter of the economist Wacław Józef Łuszczewski and the writer Magdalena Łuszczewska, was a Polish poet and novelist.

Great-grandson of Constance Jauch was the Nobel Prize-winning novelist, author of "Quo vadis", Henryk Sienkiewicz (1846–1916). His daughter was the painter Jadwiga Sienkiewicz-Korniłowiczowa.

Another great-grandson was the founder of the Polish historical study of literature Ignacy Chrzanowski (1866–1940), who died during the Sonderaktion Krakau at Sachsenhausen concentration camp. His son Lieutenant Bogdan Chrzanowski was murdered by Soviet soldiers, on the expressed orders of Joseph Stalin, in the Katyn massacre. His daughter Hanna Chrzanowska  is being investigated by the Catholic Church for possible sainthood. The council of cardinals in Rome has decreed that she has practised the cardinal virtues of Faith, Hope and Charity to a heroic degree and, therefore, may be referred to as Venerable Servant of God.

Constance Jauch's granddaughter Anna Cieciszowska was sister-in-law of Magdalena Agnieszka Sapieżyna (1739–1780), daughter of Antoni Benedykt Lubomirski and informal consort of King Stanisław August Poniatowski. Great-aunt of Constance's progeny Lelewel was Jadwiga Walewska (b. 1740), sister-in-law of Countess Maria Walewska (1786–1817), mistress of Napoleon Bonaparte.

Eleonora Maria Jauch (1732–1797) married Overbeck
Eleonora Maria Jauch (1732–1797), daughter of The Very Reverend and vice-dean of the cathedral of Bardowick Johann Christian Jauch (1702–1788), married Georg Christian Overbeck (1713–1786), lawyer at Lübeck and son of the dean Caspar Nicolaus Overbeck. Her son was the mayor of Lübeck Christian Adolph Overbeck (1755–1821). Before he was a senator of Lübeck and sent three times as ambassador Lübeck's to Paris, where he attended on 1 April 1810 the marriage of Napoleon I and Marie Louise, Duchess of Parma in the Louvre and later the "banquet imperial" there, distorting in his ironical, Jonathan Swift citing comment a line of Virgil's Aeneid: "quaeque et pulcerrima vidi, et quorum pars parva fui.".

Her grandson was the painter and head of the Nazarene movement Johann Friedrich Overbeck (1789–1869), decorated with the Prussian Order Pour le Mérite for Sciences and Arts. On 7 February 1857 Pope Pius IX came for a personal visit in his home, the Villa Cancellotti next to the Via Merulana in Rome. At that time he was painting the large-sized "Christ absconding from the Jews" (1858), a commission from Pius IX, and an allegory on the pope's escape 1848 from Rome in disguise as a regular priest, originally on a ceiling in the Quirinal Palace, later covered by the king, and now hanging in front of the Aula delle Benedizione in the Vatican. The Pope encouraged him:

The archaeologist Johannes Adolph Overbeck (1826–1895) was Constance Jauch's grand-grandson. Her great-granddaughter Cäcilie Lotte Eleonore Overbeck (1856-post 1920),  married the anthropologist and ethnologist Emil Ludwig Schmidt (1837–1906), who was personal physician of the hypochondriac "Cannon King" Alfred Krupp. The great-granddaughter Wilhelmine Friederike Charlotte Overbeck (1829–1908) was wedded to the well known mechanical engineer Franz Reuleaux (1829–1905), chairman of the German panel of judges for the Centennial International Exhibition in Philadelphia 1876. Great-great-granddaughter Agnes Elisabeth Overbeck (1870–1919), a pianist, was married under the pseudonym "Baron Eugen Borisowitsch Onégin" to the operatic contralto Sigrid Onégin, who sang inter alia at Metropolitan Opera and Covent Garden.

Buddenbrook-Nobility
The denotation ″Buddenbrook-Nobility″ traces back to Thomas Mann's novel Buddenbrooks which won Mann the Nobel Prize in Literature in 1929. Mann portrayed the manner of life and mores of the Hanseatics in the 19th century. The city where the Buddenbrook family lives shares so many of its street names and other details with Mann's hometown of Lübeck that the identification is perfect, although Mann carefully avoids explicit pronunciation of the name throughout the novel. In spite of this fact, many German readers, in particular such from Lübeck, and critics attacked Mann for writing about the "dirty laundry" of his hometown and his own family. However, for a long time that what had been attacked in the past was later regarded being an ennoblement. Those who have a close or distant relative, who has been portrayed in the Buddenbrooks, are half-ironically but at the same time respectfully counted among the "Buddenbrook-nobility".

Descendant Charlotte Leithoff (1819–1903) married consul Johann Heinrich Harms (1810–1893) (in the novel: August Möllendorpf), brother of the senator Georg Friedrich Harms (1811–1892) (in the novel: Senator Möllendorpf), who was married to the descendant Emma Wilhelmine Buck (1832–1896) (in the novel: Frau Möllendorpf geb. Langhals) and father of Lorenz Harms (1840–1915) (in the novel: Konsul Kistenmaker). Eleonora Maria Jauch's great-granddaughter Henriette Charlotte Harms (1842–1928) married the senator of Lübeck Johann Fehling (1835–1893), brother of the mayor of Lübeck   (in the novel: Dr. Moritz Hagenström) und brother-in-law of the mayor of Lübeck   (in the novel: Bürgermeister Kaspar Oeverdieck). He was a grandson of the poet Emanuel Geibel (in the novel: Jean Jacques Hoffstede). Their daughter Emilie Charlotte Adele Fehling (1865–1890) married the novelist Lieutenant , brother of the Field Marshal und President of Germany Paul von Hindenburg.

Ludovica Jauch (1772–1805)

married Deetz
The granddaughter of The Very Reverend and vice-dean of the cathedral of Bardowick Johann Christian Jauch (1702–1788), Margaretha Eleonora Ludovica Jauch (1772–1805) was married twice. Son from her first marriage with the merchant Johann Carl Deetz was Colonel  (1772–1852) who became in 1847 town major of Wittenberg. Later he became head of the central office of the Prussian Minister of War. 1848–1854 he was town major of Frankfurt, member of the Frankfurt Parliament and one of the thirtytwo members of the Emperor Deputation, chosen by the National Assembly, which offered on 3 April 1849 the Imperial Crown of Germany to Frederick William IV of Prussia.

Otto von Bismarck was at that time the Prussian envoy to the Federal Convention in Frankfurt. His relationship to Albert Deetz as town commandant of Frankfurt and member of the Convention was distressed, because Deetz strictly refused to cooperate with him. Bismarck reported to Berlin:

Ludovica Jauch's great-great-grandson was Lieutenant Commander Friedrich Deetz, commander of the German submarine U-757, which was sunk 1944 in the North Atlantic, south-west of Iceland, by depth charges from the British frigate  and the Canadian corvette . Another great-great-grandson, Colonel Günther Nentwig (1899–1943), bearer of the Knight's Cross of the Iron Cross, was killed in action as commander of the 295. Infanterie-Division in the Battle of Stalingrad.

married Griebel

After the death of her first husband Ludovica Jauch married the bassoonist of the Royal Prussian Court Orchestra Johann Heinrich Griebel (1772–1852), stemming from a musical family whose members belonged to the royal orchestra of King Frederick II of Prussia. He was the first teacher of the composer Albert Lortzing, the main representative of the German Spieloper.

Her Stepchild Frederick Griebel (1819–1859), who lived in Toronto, was the first professional violinist in Canada. Even 20 years after his death his reputation survived as that of “the greatest violinist ever resident in this city.″

Her stepgrandchild was the New York City architect George Henry Griebel (1846–1933), who built 1871 in San Antonio, Texas the quadrangle at Fort Sam Houston, later the Dakota Building in New York and the grand staircase in the Great Hall of the Library of Congress.

Wilhelmine Jauch (1809–1893) married Avé-Lallemant
Wilhelmine Jauch (1809–1893) married Theodor Avé-Lallemant, from his maternal side a descendant of the Huguenot leader in the French Wars of Religion Gaspard II de Coligny (1519–1572). Avé-Lallemant was a musician, music-teacher and music-critic. His wife's wealth enabled him, to become after getting married an important promoter of the music and to play for almost half a century a leading role in Hamburg's music life. He was until his death the chief director of the Hamburg Philharmonic Society. In 1841 he organized and directed the 3rd North German Music Festival in 1841 in Hamburg, which was the biggest festival of its time.

Hans von Bülow dedicated to Avé-Lallemant his Chant polonais Opus 12. Klaus Mann describes in his novel Pathetic Symphony about the life of Peter Tchaikovsky a meeting between Tchaikovsky and Avé-Lallemant. Tchaikovsky dedicated to his admirer Avé-Lallemant, for whom he had a lot of sympathy, his 5th Symphony.
 

Johannes Brahms, who was a fourth cousin twice removed of Robert Jauch (1856–1909) and Bertha Jauch (1860–1935), and Robert Schumann became godfathers of two of Theodor Avé-Lallemant's and Wilhelmine Jauch's sons.

The collection of letters from a number of composers and scores by Brahms is since 2000 part of the collection of the Brahms-Institut. Avé-Lallemant, who played the violin himself, possessed the Cremonese violin of Prince Louis Ferdinand of Prussia (1772–1806). Apart from being a soldier in the Napoleonic wars, Louis Ferdinand was also a gifted musician and composer. The prince brought his violin also to military campaigns. He bequeathed it to his friend, Avé-Lallemant's father, the evening before his death in the Battle of Saalfeld with the words: ″In case that I will not return from the battle.″

Charlotte Jauch (1811–1872) married Lührsen

Luise Jauch (1815–1881) married Halske

Bertha Jauch (1860–1935) married Knoop

Other known Families with the Name "Jauch"

Citizens of the Canton of Uri in the Old Swiss Confederacy
The  from the Canton of Uri in the Old Swiss Confederacy, are chronicled since 1368. They stepped up significantly for the first time with Hans Jauch (1500–1568), who won 1531 during the Reformation in Switzerland for the Roman Catholic cantons the Second War of Kappel.
 The Altdorf main branch of these Jauch became known as Swiss mercenaries.	
 This family is not related to the Hanseatic Jauch covered here.

Commoners of the Grand Duchy of Baden
Neither are related to the Hanseatic Jauch the Jauch of Villingen-Schwenningen and the surrounding municipalities in today's Schwarzwald-Baar district, who were commoners of the Grand Duchy of Baden.

Most Jauch spread over the world in present-day time descend from these Jauch, of whom a number due to poverty and famine emigrated with hundreds of other inhabitants in several waves from 1747–1754, 1801, 1817, 1847 and in the period thereafter until about 1890 to Prussia, Bessarabia, the United States and Canada.
The municipality had calculated that it would cost less to send the poorest to America than it would to support them until the famine ended, which resulted from the bad potato harvest in 1846.

To the Jauch of Schwennigen belongs – though stationed in Hamburg – the SS Oberscharführer , who was convicted and given the death sentence in 1946 because of his involvement in the killings in the subcamp Bullenhuser Damm of the Neuengamme concentration camp.

Commoners of the Electorate of Saxony
Another Jauch family considered in the literature originates from Pegau and spread to Meißen in the Electorate of Saxony. Their ancestor was the butcher Andreas Jauch (b. 1523) and their best known member was the jurist and controlling clerk of the 17th century Haubold Gottfried Jauch. There is no relationship to the Hanseatic Jauch family, too.

Family tree (under construction)

Bibliography

Family-related literature

General literature

Films
 (→ The reconstruction of the Potsdamer Stadtschloss (Potsdam City Palace) – completed in 2013 – around the old palace's Fortuna Gate, which was initiated by Günther Jauch, who donated the reconstruction of the Fortuna Gate in 2000–2001.)
 (→ Heinrich Jauch, First State Attorney at Hamburg and the persecution of the Red Marine.)
 (→ 700 Waffen-SS soldiers under the command of descendant Generalleutnant Karl Fischer von Treuenfeld laying siege to the Church of Saints Cyril and Methodius in Prague with Fischer von Treuenfeld inspecting the first dead paratroopers at 2:34.)
 (→ SM U-40 (Germany), whose second officer lieutenant Rudolf Jauch died in the sinking.)
 (→ Father Robert Jauch OFM, at the time living in the Church of the Holy Sepulchre in Jerusalem, in which the control of the building is shared between several Christian churches in complicated arrangements, essentially unchanged for centuries, provides an insight into his, Roman Catholic, perspective of the life in the church.)
 (→ Günther Jauch explains the history and the Riesling wine of his Von Othegraven Winery.)
 (→ The Marmorpalais (Marble Palace) at Potsdam on the shores of the Heiliger See (Holy Lake), situated directly opposite to the Villa Jauch on the shores of the lake. Since April 14, 2006 all 40 rooms have been renovated and opened to the public, Günther Jauch starting the renovation with a donation for the roof repairs.)

External links

References 

 
German families
Hanseatic families